Juan Pablo Cervantes García (born 23 June 1992) is a Mexican Paralympic athlete. He represented Mexico at the 2020 Summer Paralympics, where he won a bronze medal in the 100 meters T54 event. Formerly a wheelchair basketballer, Cervantes García changed to parathletism after his coach suggested him to do it. He first represented the country at the Paralympics in London 2012, where he competed in the 100 m T54, 400 m T54 and  T53–T54 events, but did not classify in any.

References

External links
 Profile at Paralympic.com

1992 births
Living people
Athletes (track and field) at the 2012 Summer Paralympics
Athletes (track and field) at the 2020 Summer Paralympics
Mexican male wheelchair racers
Medalists at the 2019 Parapan American Games
Medalists at the 2020 Summer Paralympics
Paralympic athletes of Mexico
Paralympic gold medalists for Mexico
Paralympic bronze medalists for Mexico
Paralympic medalists in athletics (track and field)
Paralympic wheelchair racers
Athletes from Mexico City